Time (stylized in all caps) is an American news magazine based in New York City. For nearly a century, it was published weekly, but starting in March 2020 it transitioned to every other week. It was first published in New York City on March 3, 1923, and for many years it was run by its influential co-founder, Henry Luce. A European edition (Time Europe, formerly known as Time Atlantic) is published in London and also covers the Middle East, Africa, and, since 2003, Latin America. An Asian edition (Time Asia) is based in Hong Kong. The South Pacific edition, which covers Australia, New Zealand, and the Pacific Islands, is based in Sydney.

Since 2018, Time has been owned by Salesforce founder Marc Benioff, who acquired it from Meredith Corporation. Benioff currently publishes the magazine through the company Time USA, LLC.

History

Time has been based in New York City since its first issue published on March 3, 1923, by Briton Hadden (1898–1929) and Henry Luce (1898–1967). It was the first weekly news magazine in the United States. The two had previously worked together as chairman and managing editor, respectively, of the Yale Daily News. They first called the proposed magazine Facts, wanting to emphasize brevity so a busy man could read it in an hour. They changed the name to Time and used the slogan "Take Time – It's Brief". Hadden was considered carefree and liked to tease Luce. He saw Time as important but also fun, which accounted for its heavy coverage of celebrities and politicians, the entertainment industry and pop culture, criticizing it as too light for serious news.

Time set out to tell the news through people, and until the late 1960s, the magazine's cover depicted a single person. More recently, Time has incorporated "People of the Year" issues which grew in popularity over the years. The first issue of Time featured Joseph G. Cannon, the retired Speaker of the House of Representatives, on its cover; a facsimile reprint of Issue No. 1, including all of the articles and advertisements contained in the original, was included with copies of the magazine's issue from February 28, 1938, in commemoration of its 15th anniversary. The cover price was 15¢ (equivalent to $ in ). On Hadden's death in 1929, Luce became the dominant man at Time and a major figure in the history of 20th-century media. According to Time Inc.: The Intimate History of a Publishing Enterprise 1972–2004 by Robert Elson, "Roy Edward Larsen ... was to play a role second only to Luce's in the development of Time Inc". In his book The March of Time, 1935–1951, Raymond Fielding also noted that Larsen was "originally circulation manager and then general manager of Time, later publisher of Life, for many years president of Time Inc., and in the long history of the corporation the most influential and important figure after Luce".

Around the time they were raising $100,000 from wealthy Yale alumni such as Henry P. Davison, partner of J.P. Morgan & Co., publicity man Martin Egan and J.P. Morgan & Co. banker Dwight Morrow; Henry Luce and Briton Hadden hired Larsen in 1922 – although Larsen was a Harvard graduate and Luce and Hadden were Yale graduates. After Hadden died in 1929, Larsen purchased 550 shares of Time Inc., using money he obtained from selling RKO stock he had inherited from his father, who was the head of the Benjamin Franklin Keith theater chain in New England. However, after Briton Hadden's death, the largest Time, Inc. stockholder was Henry Luce, who ruled the media conglomerate in an autocratic fashion; "at his right hand was Larsen", Time's second-largest stockholder, according to Time Inc.: The Intimate History of a Publishing Enterprise 1923–1941. In 1929, Roy Larsen was also named a Time Inc. director and vice president. J. P. Morgan retained a certain control through two directorates and a share of stocks, both over Time and Fortune. Other shareholders were Brown Brothers W. A. Harriman & Co., and the New York Trust Company (Standard Oil).

The Time Inc. stock owned by Luce at the time of his death was worth about $109 million , and it had been yielding him a yearly dividend of more than $2.4 million , according to Curtis Prendergast's The World of Time Inc.: The Intimate History of a Changing Enterprise 1957–1983. The Larsen family's Time stock was worth around $80 million during the 1960s, and Roy Larsen was both a Time Inc. director and the chairman of its executive committee, later serving as Time's vice chairman of the board until the middle of 1979. On September 10, 1979, The New York Times wrote, "Mr. Larsen was the only employee in the company's history given an exemption from its policy of mandatory retirement at age 65."

After Time magazine began publishing its weekly issues in March 1923, Roy Larsen was able to increase its circulation by using U.S. radio and movie theaters around the world. It often promoted both Time magazine and U.S. political and corporate interests. According to The March of Time, as early as 1924, Larsen had brought Time into the infant radio business with the broadcast of a 15-minute sustaining quiz show entitled Pop Question which survived until 1925". Then in 1928, Larsen "undertook the weekly broadcast of a 10-minute programme series of brief news summaries, drawn from current issues of Time magazine ... which was originally broadcast over 33 stations throughout the United States".

Larsen next arranged for the 30-minute radio program The March of Time to be broadcast over CBS beginning on March 6, 1931. Each week, the program presented a dramatization of the week's news for its listeners; thus Time magazine itself was brought "to the attention of millions previously unaware of its existence", according to Time Inc.: The Intimate History of a Publishing Enterprise 1923–1941, leading to an increased circulation of the magazine during the 1930s. Between 1931 and 1937, Larsen's The March of Time radio program was broadcast over CBS radio, and between 1937 and 1945, it was broadcast over NBC radio – except between 1939 and 1941, when it was not aired. People magazine was based on Time "People" page.

In 1987, Jason McManus succeeded Henry Grunwald as editor-in-chief, and oversaw the transition before Norman Pearlstine succeeded him in 1995.
In 1989, when Time, Inc. and Warner Communications merged, Time became part of Time Warner, along with Warner Bros. In 2000, Time became part of AOL Time Warner, which reverted to the name Time Warner in 2003.

In 2007, Time moved from a Monday subscription/newsstand delivery to a schedule where the magazine goes on sale Fridays, and is delivered to subscribers on Saturday. The magazine actually began in 1923 with Friday publication.

In early 2007, the year's first issue was delayed for roughly a week due to "editorial changes", including the layoff of 49 employees.

In 2009, Time announced that they were introducing Mine, a personalized print magazine mixing content from a range of Time Warner publications based on the reader's preferences. The new magazine was met with a poor reception, with criticism that its focus was too broad to be truly personal.

The magazine has an online archive with the unformatted text for every article published. The articles are indexed and were converted from scanned images using optical character recognition technology. The minor errors in the text are remnants of the conversion into digital format.

In January 2013, Time Inc. announced that it would cut nearly 500 jobs – roughly 6% of its 8,000 staff worldwide. Although Time magazine has maintained high sales, its ad pages have declined significantly over time.

Also in January 2013, Time Inc. named Martha Nelson as the first female editor-in-chief of its magazine division. In September 2013, Nancy Gibbs was named as the first female managing editor of Time magazine.

In November 2017, Meredith Corporation announced its acquisition of Time, Inc., backed by Koch Equity Development. In March 2018, only six weeks after the closure of the sale, Meredith announced that it would explore the sale of Time and sister magazines Fortune, Money and Sports Illustrated, since they did not align with the company's lifestyle brands.

In 2017, editor and journalist Catherine Mayer, who also founded the Women's Equality Party in the UK, sued Time through attorney Ann Olivarius for sex and age discrimination. The suit was resolved in 2018.

In September 2018, Meredith Corporation announced that it would re-sell Time to Marc Benioff and his wife Lynne for $190 million, a transaction completed on October 31. Although Benioff is the chairman and co-CEO of Salesforce.com, Time  was to remain separate from that company and Benioff would not be involved in the magazine's daily operations. The sale was completed on October 31, 2018. Time USA LLC, the parent company of the magazine, is owned by Marc Benioff.

Time Canada
From 1942 until 1979, Time had a Canadian edition that included an insert of five pages of locally produced content as well as occasional Canadian covers. Following changes in the tax status of Canadian editions of American magazines, Time closed Canadian bureaus, except for Ottawa, and published identical content to the US edition but with Canadian advertising. In December 2008, Time discontinued publishing a Canadian advertiser edition.

Circulation
During the second half of 2009, the magazine had a 34.9% decline in newsstand sales. During the first half of 2010, another decline of at least one-third in Time magazine sales occurred. In the second half of 2010, Time magazine newsstand sales declined by about 12% to just over 79,000 copies per week.

As of 2012, it had a circulation of 3.3 million, making it the 11th-most circulated magazine in the United States, and the second-most circulated weekly behind People. As of July 2017, its circulation was 3,028,013. In October 2017, Time cut its circulation to two million. The print edition has a readership of 1.6 million, 1 million of whom are based in the United States.

Style

Writing
Time initially possessed a distinctively "acerbic, irreverent style", largely created by Haddon and sometimes called "Timestyle". Timestyle made regular use of inverted sentences, as famously parodied in 1936 by Wolcott Gibbs in The New Yorker: "Backward ran sentences until reeled the mind ... Where it all will end, knows God!" Time also coined or popularized many neologisms like "socialite", "guesstimate", "televangelist", "pundit", and "tycoon", as well as some less successful ones like "cinemactress" and "radiorator". Time introduced the name "World War II" in 1939. The false title construction was popularized by Time and indeed is sometimes called a "Time-style adjective".

Sections

Milestones
Since its first issue, Time has had a "Milestones" section about significant events in the lives of famous people, including births, marriages, divorces, and deaths. Until 1967, entries in Milestones were short and formulaic. A typical example from 1956:
Died. Lieut, (j.g.) David Greig ("Skippy") Browning Jr., 24, star of the 1952 Olympics as the U.S.'s dazzling three-meter diving champion, national collegiate one-and three-meter diving champ (1951-52); in the crash of a North American FJ-3 Fury jet fighter while on a training flight; near Rantoul, Kans.
A reader wrote a parody of the older form to announce the change:
Died. Time's delightful but confusing habit of listing names, ages, claims to fame and other interesting tidbits about the famous newly deceased in its Milestones notices; then the circumstances of, and places where, the deaths occurred; of apparent good sentence structure; in New York.

Listings
Until the mid-1970s, Time had a weekly "Listings" section with capsule summaries or reviews of current significant films, plays, musicals, television programs, and literary bestsellers similar to The New Yorker "Current Events" section.

Cover
Time is also known for the red border on its cover, introduced in 1927. The iconic red border was homaged or satirized by Seattle's The Stranger newspaper in 2010. The border has only been changed eight times since 1927:

The special issue released shortly after the September 11 attacks on the United States had a black border to symbolize mourning. The next regularly scheduled issue returned to the red border. 
The Earth Day issue from April 28, 2008, dedicated to environmental issues, had a green border.
The issue from September 19, 2011, commemorating the 10th anniversary of September 11 attacks, had a metallic silver border.
On December 31, 2012, the cover had a silver border, celebrating Barack Obama's selection as Person of the Year.
On November 28 and December 5, 2016, the magazine had a silver border covering the "Most Influential Photos of All Time".
The issue from June 15, 2020, covering the protests surrounding the murder of George Floyd, was the first time that the cover's border included names of people. The cover, by artist Titus Kaphar, depicts an African-American mother holding her child.
The issues from September 21 and 28, 2020, covering the American response to the coronavirus pandemic, had a black border.
The issues from September 26 and October 3, 2022 covering the death of Queen Elizabeth II, had a silver border.

Former president Richard Nixon has been among the most frequently-featured on the cover of Time, having appeared 55 times from August 25, 1952, to May 2, 1994.

In October 2020, the magazine replaced its logo with the word "Vote", explaining that "Few events will shape the world to come more than the result of the upcoming US presidential election".

2007 redesign
In 2007, Time redesigned the magazine in order to update and modernize the format. Among other changes, the magazine reduced the red cover border to promote featured stories, enlarged column titles, reduced the number of featured stories, increased white space around articles, and accompanied opinion pieces with photographs of the writers. The changes were met with both criticism and praise.

Special editions

Person of the Year

Times most famous feature throughout its history has been the annual "Person of the Year" (formerly "Man of the Year") cover story, in which Time recognizes the individual or group of individuals who have had the biggest impact on news headlines over the past 12 months. The distinction is supposed to go to the person who, "for good or ill", has most affected the course of the year; it is, therefore, not necessarily an honor or a reward. In the past, such figures as Adolf Hitler and Joseph Stalin have been Man of the Year.

In 2006, Person of the Year was "You", and was met with split reviews. Some thought the concept was creative; others wanted an actual person of the year. Editors Pepper and Timmer reflected that, if it had been a mistake, "we're only going to make it once".

In 2017, Time named the "Silence Breakers", people who came forward with personal stories of sexual harassment, as Person of the Year.

Time 100

In recent years, Time has assembled an annual list of the 100 most influential people of the year. Originally, they had made a list of the 100 most influential people of the 20th century. These issues usually have the front cover filled with pictures of people from the list and devote a substantial amount of space within the magazine to the 100 articles about each person on the list. In some cases, over 100 people have been included, as when two people have made the list together, sharing one spot.

The magazine also compiled "All-Time 100 best novels" and "All-Time 100 Movies" lists in 2005, "The 100 Best TV Shows of All-Time" in 2007, and "All-Time 100 Fashion Icons" in 2012.

In February 2016, Time mistakenly included the male author Evelyn Waugh on its "100 Most Read Female Writers in College Classes" list (he was 97th on the list). The error created much media attention and concerns about the level of basic education among the magazine's staff. Time later issued a retraction.  In a BBC interview with Justin Webb, Professor Valentine Cunningham of Corpus Christi College, Oxford, described the mistake as "a piece of profound ignorance on the part of Time magazine".

Red X covers

During its history, on six occasions, Time has released a special issue with a cover showing an X scrawled over the face of a man or a national symbol. The first Time magazine with a red X cover was released on May 7, 1945, showing a red X over Adolf Hitler's face which was published the week following his death. The second X cover was released more than three months later on August 20, 1945, with a black X (to date, the magazine's only such use of a black X) covering the flag of Japan, representing the recent surrender of Japan and which signaled the end of World War II. Fifty-eight years later, on April 21, 2003, Time released another issue with a red X over Saddam Hussein's face, two weeks after the start of the Invasion of Iraq. On June 13, 2006, Time printed a red X cover issue following the death of Abu Musab al-Zarqawi in a U.S. airstrike in Iraq. The second most recent red X cover issue of Time was published on May 2, 2011, after the death of Osama bin Laden. , the most recent red X cover issue of Time features a red X scrawled over the year 2020 and the declaration "the worst year ever".

Cover logo replaced by "Vote" logo
The November 2, 2020, issue of the U.S. edition of the magazine was the first time that the cover logo "TIME" was not used. The cover of that issue used the word "VOTE" as a replacement logo, along with artwork by Shepard Fairey of a voter wearing a pandemic face mask, accompanied by information on how to vote. The magazine's editor-in-chief and CEO Edward Felsenthal explained this decision for a one-time cover logo change as a "rare moment, one that will separate history into before and after for generations".

Time for Kids

Time for Kids is a division magazine of Time that is especially published for children and is mainly distributed in classrooms. TFK contains some national news, a "Cartoon of the Week", and a variety of articles concerning popular culture. An annual issue concerning the environment is distributed near the end of the U.S. school term. The publication rarely exceeds ten pages front and back.

Time LightBox
Time LightBox is a photography blog created and curated by the magazine's photo department that was launched in 2011. In 2011, Life picked LightBox for its Photo Blog Awards.

TimePieces NFTs 
TimePieces is a Web3 community NFT initiative from Time. It included works from over 40 artists from multiple disciplines.

Staff
Richard Stengel was the managing editor from May 2006 to October 2013, when he joined the U.S. State Department. Nancy Gibbs was the managing editor from September 2013 until September 2017. She was succeeded by Edward Felsenthal, who had been Time's digital editor.

Editors
 Briton Hadden (1923–1929)
 Henry Luce (1929–1949)
 T. S. Matthews (1949–1953)
 Roy Alexander (1960–1966)

Managing editors

Notable contributors
 Aravind Adiga, correspondent for three years, winner of the 2008 Man Booker Prize for fiction
 James Agee, book and movie editor
 Curt Anderson, member of the Maryland House of Delegates
 Ann Blackman, deputy news chief in Washington
 Ian Bremmer, current editor-at-large
 Margaret Carlson, the first female columnist
 Robert Cantwell, writer, editor 1936—1941
 Whittaker Chambers, writer, senior editor 1939—1948
 Richard Corliss, film critic since 1980
 Brad Darrach, film critic
 Nigel Dennis, drama critic
 John Gregory Dunne, reporter; later author and screenwriter
 Peter Economy, author and editor
 Alexander Eliot, art editor 1945–1961, author of 18 books on art, mythology, and history
 John T. Elson, religion editor who wrote famous 1966 "Is God Dead?" cover story
 Dean E. Fischer, reporter and editor, 1964–1981
 Nancy Gibbs, essayist and editor-at-large; has written more than 100 cover stories
 Lev Grossman, wrote primarily about books and technology
 Deena Guzder, human rights journalist and author
 Wilder Hobson, reporter in 1930s and '40s
 Robert Hughes, long-tenured art critic
 Pico Iyer, essayist and novelist, essayist since 1986
 Alvin M. Josephy Jr., photo editor 1952–1960; also a historian and Hollywood screenwriter
 Weldon Kees, critic
 Joe Klein, author (Primary Colors) and columnist who wrote the "In the Arena" column
 Louis Kronenberger, drama critic 1938–1961
 Andre Laguerre, Paris bureau chief 1948–1956, London bureau chief 1951–1956, also wrote about sports; later managing editor of Sports Illustrated
 Nathaniel Lande, author, filmmaker, and former creative director
 Will Lang Jr. 1936–1968, Time Life International
 Marshall Loeb, writer and editor 1956–1980
 Tim McGirk, war correspondent and bureau chief in South Asia, Latin America, and Jerusalem 1998–2009
 John Moody, Vatican and Rome correspondent 1986–1996
 Jim Murray, West Coast correspondent 1948–1955
 Lance Morrow, backpage essayist from 1976 to 2000
 Roger Rosenblatt, essayist 1979–2006
 Richard Schickel, film critic 1965–2010
 Hugh Sidey, political reporter and columnist, beginning in 1957
 Donald L. Barlett and James B. Steele, investigative reporters who won two National Magazine Awards
 Joel Stein, columnist who wrote the "Joel 100" just after the 2006 "Most Influential" issue
 Calvin Trillin, food writer and reporter 1960–1963
 David Von Drehle, current editor-at-large
 Lasantha Wickrematunge, journalist
 Robert Wright, contributing editor
 Fareed Zakaria, current editor-at-large

Snapshot: 1940 editorial staff

In 1940, William Saroyan (1908–1981) lists the full Time editorial department in the play, Love's Old Sweet Song.

This 1940 snapshot includes:
 Editor: Henry R. Luce
 Managing Editors:  Manfred Gottfried, Frank Norris, T.S. Matthews
 Associate Editors:  Carlton J. Balliett Jr., Robert Cantwell, Laird S. Goldsborough, David W. Hulburd Jr., John Stuart Martin, Fanny Saul, Walter Stockly, Dana Tasker, Charles Weretenbaker
 Contributing Editors:  Roy Alexander, John F. Allen, Robert W. Boyd Jr., Roger Butterfield, Whittaker Chambers, James G. Crowley, Robert Fitzgerald, Calvin Fixx, Walter Graebner, John Hersey, Sidney L. James, Eliot Janeway, Pearl Kroll, Louis Kronenberger, Thomas K. Krug, John T. McManus, Sherry Mangan, Peter Matthews, Robert Neville, Emeline Nollen, Duncan Norton-Taylor, Sidney A. Olson, John Osborne, Content Peckham, Green Peyton, Williston C. Rich Jr., Winthrop Sargeant, Robert Sherrod, Lois Stover, Leon Svirsky, Felice Swados, Samuel G. Welles Jr., Warren Wilhelm, and Alfred Wright Jr.
 Editorial Assistants:  Ellen May Ach, Sheila Baker, Sonia Bigman, Elizabeth Budelrnan, Maria de Blasio, Hannah Durand, Jean Ford, Dorothy Gorrell, Helen Gwynn, Edith Hind, Lois Holsworth, Diana Jackson, Mary V. Johnson, Alice Lent, Kathrine Lowe, Carolyn Marx, Helen McCreery, Gertrude McCullough, Mary Louise Mickey, Anna North, Mary Palmer, Tabitha Petran, Elizabeth Sacartoff, Frances Stevenson, Helen Vind, Eleanor Welch, and Mary Welles.

Competitors in the US
Other major American news magazines:
 The Atlantic (1857)
 Bloomberg Businessweek (1929)
 Mother Jones (1976)
 The Nation (1865)
 National Review (1955)
 The New Republic (1914)
 The New Yorker (1925)
 Newsmax (1998)
 Newsweek (1933)
 U.S. News & World Report (1923)
 The Weekly Standard (1995–2018)

See also

 Heroes of the Environment
 Lists of covers of Time magazine

References

Further reading 
 
 
 
 

 Elson, Robert T. Time Inc: The Intimate History of a Publishing Enterprise, 1923–1941 (1968); vol. 2: The World of Time Inc.: The Intimate History, 1941–1960 (1973), official corporate history. vol 1 online also vol 2 online

 Herzstein, Robert E.  Henry R. Luce, Time, and the American Crusade in Asia (2006) online
 Herzstein, Robert E. Henry R. Luce: A Political Portrait of the Man Who Created the American Century (1994). online

External links
  – official site
 Time magazine vault – archive of magazines and covers from 1923 through present
 Time  articles by Whittaker Chambers 1939–1948 – Time on the Hiss Case, 1948–1953 
Archived Time Magazines on the Internet Archive
 TimeLine: 4535 Time Magazine Covers, 1923–2009 by Lev Manovich and Jeremy Douglass. A 2009 Cultural Analytics Lab project. 
 
 

 
News magazines published in the United States
Biweekly magazines published in the United States
Weekly magazines published in the United States
English-language magazines
Magazines established in 1923
Magazines formerly owned by Meredith Corporation
Magazines published in New York City
1923 establishments in New York City
Weekly news magazines
American news websites